Fatehyab Ali Khan (1936 – 26 September 2010) was a Pakistani social and political activist and lawyer, who served as chairperson of the Pakistan Institute of International Affairs, president of Mazdoor Kisan Party, and the first-ever president of students union of Karachi University.

During his political activism, he criticised military dictatorship in Pakistan and was detained later displaced by the military dictator general and later field marshal Ayub Khan for taking part in political movements.

Early life
Fatehyab was born in 1936 in Hyderabad. He migrated from Bombay (now Mumbai) to Pakistan in 1949 and came to one of its cities Karachi. He was fourteen when he entered in the country. He then served president of Karachi University for students union in 1962. It is claimed he played a significant role in reducing of degree course duration from three years to two, leading students earn their degrees with a minimum time span of two years which was originally set for three years. After completing his education, he served as a lawyer.

Political activities
In 1964 general elections, he took part in election campaign of Fatima Jinnah and supported her against military dictator Ayub Khan who later detained him for his role in elections. He was actively involved in Pakistan's democracy restoration movement, leading him to act against the will of general Muhammad Zia-ul-Haq. He was put in jail by the government for his contribution to the political movements and was displaced by the administration. He was also displaced from Sindh by the military government of the country for taking part in a movement against Ayub’s coup d'état.

Death
Fatahyab Ali Khan was suffering from chronic conditions and was subsequently admitted to the Aga Khan University Hospital, Karachi for medical treatment, and died on 26 September 2010.

References

Pakistani democracy activists
1936 births
2010 deaths
Lawyers from Karachi
Pakistani people of Hyderabadi descent